Andrew Chooi Kah Ming (born 25 February 1991) is a Malaysian retired badminton player. He won the boys' doubles title at the 2009 World Junior Championships partnered with Ow Yao Han. Chooi played with several partners but it was with Ow that he secured his career best by finishing runners-up at the 2012 Malaysia Open Grand Prix Gold. Their highest ranking was number 25 in May 2013. Chooi retired from badminton in 2019, and started a new career as an entrepreneur.

Achievements

BWF World Junior Championships 
Boys' doubles

BWF Grand Prix (2 runners-up) 
The BWF Grand Prix had two levels, the BWF Grand Prix and Grand Prix Gold. It was a series of badminton tournaments sanctioned by the Badminton World Federation (BWF) which was held from 2007 to 2017.

Men's doubles

  BWF Grand Prix Gold tournament
  BWF Grand Prix tournament

BWF International Challenge/Series (3 titles, 2 runners-up) 
Men's doubles

  BWF International Challenge tournament
  BWF International Series tournament
  BWF Future Series tournament

References

External links 
 

Living people
1991 births
People from Pahang
Malaysian male badminton players
Malaysian sportspeople of Chinese descent